The 1981 International cricket season was from May 1981 to August 1981.

Season overview

June

Australia in England

References

1981 in cricket